Oppau may refer to:

 Ludwigshafen-Oppau, a suburb of Ludwigshafen, Germany
 Oppau explosion, which occurred there in 1921
 Opawa, Lower Silesian Voivodeship (German: Oppau), Poland
 Zábřeh, Dolní Benešov, Czech Republic; See List of historical German and Czech names for places in the Czech Republic

See also
 Opava (disambiguation)
 Opawa (disambiguation)